Goksan Han clan was one of the Korean clans. Their Bon-gwan was in Koksan County, North Hwanghae Province. According to the research in 2015, the number of Goksan Han clan was 6266. He was one of Eight Scholars, and was dispatched from Song dynasty to Goryeo in 1206. After that, he was naturalized and served as munha sirang pyeongjangsa. He was appointed as Prince of Goksan. Finally, he began Goksan Han clan and made Goksan their Bon-gwan.

See also 
 Korean clan names of foreign origin

References

External links 
 

 
Korean clan names of Chinese origin